Shagram is an administrative unit, known as Union Council, of Chitral District in the Khyber Pakhtunkhwa province of Pakistan.

Chitral is the largest district in the Khyber-Pakhtunkhwa province of Pakistan, covering an area of 14,850 km². It is the northernmost district of Pakistan. The district of Chitral is divided into two tehsils and 24 Union Councils.
Chitral
Mastuj

See also 

 Chitral District

References

External links
Khyber-Pakhtunkhwa Government website section on Lower Dir
United Nations

Chitral District
Tehsils of Chitral District
Union councils of Khyber Pakhtunkhwa
Populated places in Chitral District
Union councils of Chitral District